The northern river terrapin (Batagur baska) is a species of riverine turtle native to Southeast Asia. It is classified Critically Endangered by the IUCN and considered extinct in much of its former range.

Description

The northern river terrapin is one of Asia's largest freshwater and brackwater turtles, reaching a carapace length of up to 60 cm and a maximum weight of 18 kg. Its carapace is moderately depressed, with a vertebral keel in juveniles. The plastron is large, strongly angulate laterally in the young, convex in the adult. The head is rather small, with a pointed and upwards-tending snout. The legs have band-like scales.

The upper surface of the carapace and the soft parts are generally olive-brown, while the plastron is yellowish. Head and neck are brown with reddish bases. Males in breeding coloration have a black head and neck with a crimson or orange dorsal surface and red or orange forelegs. The colour of the pupils also changes during this period, to brown in females and yellow-white in males. During the breeding season, the color of the pupils of a female brown whereas the pupils in the males become yellowish-white.

Two subspecies are recognized: B. b. baska (Gray, 1831) and B. b. ranongensis (Nutaphand, 1979).

Distribution and habitat
The species is currently found in Bangladesh and India(in the Sunderbans), Cambodia, Myanmar, Indonesia and Malaysia. It is regionally extinct in Singapore, Thailand and Vietnam. It is strongly aquatic but uses terrestrial nesting sites, frequenting the tidal areas of estuaries, large rivers, and mangrove forests.

Ecology
The northern river terrapin is omnivorous, taking waterside plants and small animals such as clams. The species prefers freshwater habitats and moves to brackish river mouths or estuaries in the breeding season (December–March), returning after laying their eggs. Individuals have been known to undertake long seasonal migrations of 50 to 60 miles to the sand banks where they were hatched. Females usually lay three clutches of 10-34 eggs each.

Conservation
The species is considered Critically Endangered by the IUCN, principally due to exploitation as a food item (including egg harvesting). Previously, immense numbers were shipped into the fish markets of Calcutta from throughout India; among the Bengali Hindus, the river terrapin was considered the most delectable of all turtles. It is still illegally exported from Indonesia and traded in large numbers in China. Loss of nesting beaches and pollution are also impacting the species.

A hatchery and captive breeding project was established in Vawal National Park at Gazipur in Bangladesh and another in Sajnekhali Forest Station in the Sunderban Tiger Reserve in India with support from Turtle Survival Alliance.

See also
Southern river terrapin

References

Further reading

External links
 Centre for Turtle Research and Conservation

Reptiles of Myanmar
Fauna of Southeast Asia
Reptiles of Indonesia
Reptiles of Thailand
Reptiles of India
Batagur
Reptiles described in 1830
Taxa named by John Edward Gray